Boy Genius Report (also referred to as BGR) is a technology-influenced website and covers topics ranging from consumer gadgets, to entertainment, gaming, and science. Founded in October 2006 by anonymous web personality Boy Genius (also referred to as BG/BGR), the site was previously based on offering the public an early look at upcoming mobile phones and devices before anyone else. On April 27, 2010, BGR was acquired by Penske Media Corporation.

Reception
BGR has been mentioned in many major news sources such as the Wall Street Journal blog Digits, ABC News, Reuters, The Huffington Post, and CNBC. Examples of BGR's ability to be the first to report news about a gadget include the first pictures of the Android 2.0 mobile operating system in 2009 and the first reported picture of the Amazon Kindle 2 in 2008.

As of August 2017 BGR reaches over 11 million unique visitors a month.

Boy Genius
While running BGR, Boy Genius kept his identity concealed. On April 27, 2010, Boy Genius revealed himself as Jonathan Geller, a 23-year-old Greenwich, Connecticut, high school dropout who never attended college. Geller chose to remain anonymous at first due to the marketing opportunities that being anonymous afforded him and his site (despite his identity being widely known by many of the organizations whose information he was disclosing). When BGR joined Penske Media Corporation, Geller decided it was best for both him and his site that he reveal himself as the site's founder and editor-in-chief.

See also
 CNET
 Engadget
 Gizmodo
 TechCrunch
 The Verge

References

External links
 

Technology blogs
Penske Media Corporation
Internet properties established in 2006